Series 3 of police drama Rush premiered on 22 July 2010 on Network Ten. The third installment continues to follow the lives of two teams employed with the prestigious Tactical Response Unit in Victoria, Australia.

Series 3 introduces new characters Audrey Khoo (Camille Keenan), an intelligence officer working alongside Leon, and Christian Tapu (Kevin Hofbauer), a young constable who joins the team. Later in the season, Sergeant Dominic Wales dies in a bomb blast.

Cast

Regular
 Rodger Corser as Senior Sergeant Lawson Blake
 Callan Mulvey as Sergeant Brendan "Josh" Joshua
 Jolene Anderson as Sergeant/Senior Constable Shannon Henry
 Josef Ber as Sergeant Dominic "Dom" Wales (until episode 5, guest stars in episode 16)
 Nicole da Silva as Senior Constable Stella Dagostino
 Ashley Zukerman as Senior Constable Michael Sandrelli
 Kevin Hofbauer as Constable Christian Tapu (from episode 1)
 Samuel Johnson as Intelligence Officer Leon Broznic
 Catherine McClements as Inspector Kerry Vincent

Recurring
 Camille Keenan as Intelligence Officer Audrey Khoo
 Nathaniel Dean as Andrew Kronin
 Ian Meadows as James Vincent
 Jane Allsop as Tash Button
Ella Shenman as Minka Button

Episodes 
{| class="wikitable plainrowheaders" style="width: 100%; margin-right: 0;"
|-
! style="background: #3251AE; color: #ffffff;"| No. in series
! style="background: #3251AE; color: #ffffff;"| No. in season
! style="background: #3251AE; color: #ffffff;"| Title
! style="background: #3251AE; color: #ffffff;"| 
! style="background: #3251AE; color: #ffffff;"| Written by
! style="background: #3251AE; color: #ffffff;"| Australian viewers(million)
! style="background: #3251AE; color: #ffffff;"| Rank(weekly)
! style="background: #3251AE; color: #ffffff;"| Original air date
|-

|}

DVD release
The first volume of the third series of Rush, containing the first 12 episode of the series was released on 3 December 2010. The second volume, containing the back half of the series was released on 3 March 2011.

References

External links 
 
 
 

2010 Australian television seasons
Fitzroy, Victoria